Jacques Thamin (born 23 May 1952) is a former professional tennis player from France.

Biography
Thamin was runner-up in the juniors event at the 1968 Wimbledon Championships, to Australian John Alexander. He also played in the men's singles draw, just days after his 16th birthday.

During the 1970s he competed professionally on the tennis circuit. He made the quarter-finals of a Grand Prix tournament in Madrid in 1973, withs wins over Steve Faulk, Antonio Muñoz and Wanaro N'Godrella. In the quarter-final he won the first set against Ilie Năstase, before losing in three. He was runner-up at the Stuttgart Open in 1974, before the event was part of the Grand Prix circuit. His only Grand Prix final was in the doubles at Paris in 1977, which he and partner Christophe Roger-Vasselin won, aided by the controversial spaghetti racquets. He was a regular competitor at the French Open, mostly in doubles, and also appeared twice at the Australian Open.

Grand Prix career finals

Doubles: 1 (1–0)

References

External links
 
 

1952 births
Living people
French male tennis players
Sportspeople from Cairo